The Garston and Liverpool Railway line ran from the St Helens and Runcorn Gap Railway line at Garston Docks to Brunswick railway station, later to central Liverpool. The company was formed on 17 May 1861 and the line opened on 1 June 1864.

Garston Dock station had opened in 1852 as the terminus of the St Helens Canal and Railway Company's line from Warrington. The Act of Parliament for this line had also given the company rights to construct a deepwater dock on the River Mersey at Garston, extending the early St Helens and Runcorn Gap Railway further down the Mersey to a better and less tidal port. The company also aspired to reach Liverpool and the Garston and Liverpool Railway would be the means for this, extending beyond the Garston terminus, and following the Mersey downstream to the North West.

Cheshire Lines 

It was absorbed by the Cheshire Lines Committee (CLC) on  5 July 1865, whose Liverpool to Manchester line joined it at Cressington Junction.

Extension to Liverpool Central 
The first terminus at Brunswick was poorly placed as a station to serve central Liverpool and almost as soon as it opened, an Act of Parliament was obtained for the Liverpool Central Station Railway, which would divert from just before Brunswick through a mile and a half of deep cuttings and tunnels in the red sandstone through St James and to a terminus at Liverpool Central. The extensive civil engineering works needed meant that construction took nearly ten years, opening on 2 March 1874. Brunswick station remained open as a goods station between Harrington Dock and Herculaneum Dock into the 1970s.

Stations

Closure and re-opening 

Although the line had been built through mostly open countryside, Liverpool's southern suburbs began to develop and expand along the line around this time, making it an important commuter route into Central station, the most central of Liverpool's three major termini. 

Competition for routes along the Mersey had led to duplication of routes within the Cheshire Lines Committee and against their competitors the London and North Western Railway. Although Central was always a busy station, it was scheduled for closure under the Beeching Axe, services to Central from Warrington and beyond Garston being re-routed around the Allerton Curve, the L&NWR Speke to Edge Hill line, and into Lime Street instead. Central High Level, and the Garston line, closed in 1972. 

The line would re-open again in 1978, as part of the electrified Merseyrail network, which integrated the underground and under-river Mersey Railway with suburban lines to North and South of Liverpool. The Garston line formed the southern portion of Merseyrail's Northern Line.

References

Bibliography 
 

Historic transport in Merseyside
Cheshire Lines Committee Lines